Melissa A. Long (born 1970/1971) is an Associate Justice of the Rhode Island Supreme Court and a former Associate Justice of the Rhode Island Superior Court.

Education and legal career 

Long received a Bachelor of Arts from the University of Virginia in 1992 and her Juris Doctor from the George Mason University Antonin Scalia Law School in 1995. After law school, she served as contract attorney in the Public Defenders office representing indigent parents in terminations of parental rights cases.  Long also served in a variety of roles at the Rhode Island Department of Transportation, including Senior Legal Counsel and Title VI Coordinator. Long served as Deputy Secretary of State and Director of Administration within the office of the Secretary of State of Rhode Island.

State court service

Rhode Island Superior Court 
On June 27, 2017, Rhode Island Governor Gina Raimondo appointed Long to be an associate justice of the Rhode Island Superior Court to fill the vacancy left by the retirement of Judge Patricia A. Hurst. On September 19, 2017, her nomination was approved in the Rhode Island Senate. She was sworn in by Governor Raimondo on October 12, 2017.

Rhode Island Supreme Court 
Long was one of six final candidates being considered for a vacancy on the Rhode Island Supreme Court. On December 8, 2020, Long was nominated by Governor Raimondo to be an associate justice of the Rhode Island Supreme Court, replacing Justice Francis Flaherty, who retired on December 31, 2020. On December 18, 2020, her nomination was confirmed by the Rhode Island Senate. With her confirmation, Long became the first African American on the court. Since the confirmation of Long and Erin Lynch Prata, the five-member court has a female majority for the first time in its history. She was sworn into office on January 11, 2021.

References

External links 

1970s births
Year of birth uncertain
Living people
Place of birth missing (living people)
20th-century American lawyers
21st-century American judges
21st-century American lawyers
20th-century American women lawyers
African-American lawyers
African-American judges
Antonin Scalia Law School alumni
Justices of the Rhode Island Supreme Court
Rhode Island lawyers
Rhode Island state court judges
Superior court judges in the United States
University of Virginia alumni
20th-century African-American women
20th-century African-American people
21st-century African-American women
21st-century African-American people
21st-century American women judges